Eren Tozlu (born 27 December 1990) is a Turkish footballer who plays as a forward for Erzurumspor.

Club career
He made his Süper Lig debut against İstanbul B.B. on 27 October 2012.

External links
 Player profile at TFF.org
 

1990 births
21st-century Turkish people
Living people
Sportspeople from Giresun
Turkish footballers
Turkey B international footballers
Association football forwards
Giresunspor footballers
Pazarspor footballers
Mersin İdman Yurdu footballers
Samsunspor footballers
Yeni Malatyaspor footballers
Büyükşehir Belediye Erzurumspor footballers
Süper Lig players
TFF First League players